This list  of carnivorous plant periodicals is a listing of periodicals devoted to the subject of carnivorous plants, most of which are (or were) published by carnivorous plant societies. The list includes magazines and journals as well as supplementary newsletters. Notable online periodicals are also listed.

Unless otherwise indicated, all information on individual publications is sourced from them directly or from their official websites. The terms bimonthly, biannual and triannual are used to mean "every two months", "twice a year" and "three times a year", respectively.

Magazines and journals
This list includes the main publications of various carnivorous plant societies. These periodicals are often printed to a high standard and typically carry articles on matters of horticultural interest, together with field reports, literature reviews, and, in some cases, peer reviewed scientific studies. Certain publications self-styled as "newsletters"—notably the Carnivorous Plant Newsletter—fall into this category, and are distinguished from the supplementary newsletters listed below.

Newsletters
This list includes supplementary publications of various carnivorous plant societies. These typically provide society-related news, information on upcoming meetings and events, as well as seed and plant sales lists.

Online publications
This list includes notable online magazines and other regular electronic publications that have received an International Standard Serial Number or OCLC number.

Notes

References

External links 
 Carnivorous plants -- Periodicals – WorldCat subject category
  Darwiniana: Knihovna – includes cover images of many magazines and newsletters 
  Literaturverzeichnis der G F P – includes listing of volume and issue numbers 
  Tištěné zdroje informací – overview of Czech-language magazines 
  情報誌(国内) – summary of Japanese-language periodicals 

 *